The following is a list of the 27 cantons of the Côtes-d'Armor department, in France, following the French canton reorganisation which came into effect in March 2015:

 Bégard
 Broons
 Callac
 Dinan
 Guerlédan
 Guingamp
 Lamballe-Armor
 Lannion
 Lanvallay
 Loudéac
 Paimpol
 Perros-Guirec
 Plaintel
 Plancoët
 Plélo
 Plénée-Jugon
 Pléneuf-Val-André
 Plérin
 Pleslin-Trigavou
 Plestin-les-Grèves
 Ploufragan
 Plouha
 Rostrenen
 Saint-Brieuc-1
 Saint-Brieuc-2
 Trégueux
 Tréguier

References